The Team competition of the 2020 European Aquatics Championships was held on 10 May 2021.

Results
The final started at 19:30.

References

Team
European Aquatics Championships